Farington railway station served Farington, south of Preston in Lancashire, England.

History
The station opened on 31 October 1838 under the ownership of the North Union Railway, and was originally named Farrington. In October 1857 it was renamed Farington. This was quadrupled at the end of the 19th century and the station expanded to four platforms as a consequence.

Closure
Farington station was closed by the British Transport Commission on 7 March 1960, (before the Beeching Axe of 1963) and was subsequently demolished.  West Coast Main Line trains run through Farington and still carry many inter-city and semi-local services and the East Lancashire Line crosses over the line close by.

Lostock Hall railway station (on the East Lancashire Line) and Leyland railway station (on the West Coast Main Line) are the nearest stops to the village.

References

Bibliography

Disused railway stations in South Ribble
Former North Union Railway stations
Railway stations in Great Britain opened in 1838
Railway stations in Great Britain closed in 1960
1838 establishments in England